Krazy was a British comic book magazine published every Monday by IPC Magazines Ltd. It ran from (issues dates) 16 October 1976 to 15 April 1978, when it merged with stable-mate Whizzer and Chips. In 1977, one of the characters in the comic, Cheeky, proved popular enough to get his own comic, Cheeky, which was later merged into Whoopee!. The comic included a "disguise" back-cover, such as the cover of a diary or brochure, which allowed readers to hide the comic from parents or teachers (although one issue on April Fool's day had the front cover upside down).

Stories
Krazy was noted for its rich content of small humorous jokes and illustrations positioned at random places among the comic strips and features. The central storyline of the comic centred around the exploits of a group of children called the Krazy Gang who lived in Krazy Town, featured in a comic strip drawn by cartoonist Ian Knox. The Krazy Gang also spawned spin-off stories within the same publication: Pongalongapongo, featuring Pongo Snodgrass, the unhygienic, bullying antagonist; and ello, It's Cheeky, a mischievous buck-toothed prankster and Krazy Gang member, drawn by Frank McDiarmid. Cheeky's popularity outgrew the spin-off strip, and after a few months the character featured in his own publication, Cheeky Weekly, launched in October 1977.

Other strip artists included Robert Nixon, Terry Bave and Bryan Hitch.

Regular Krazy comic strips included:

 ello, It's Cheeky
 Big Game Hunter (comic strip)|Big Game Hunter
 Birdman and Chicken
 Detective Fumbly's (Nut) Case Book]], a text story usually with one illustration, rather than a conventional strip
 Fit Fred and Sick Sid
 Handy Andy
 Hit Kid
 Kid Comic
 The Krazy Gang
 Micky Mimic
 Paws
 Pongalongapongo
 Ray Presto
 Over-Helpful Helen, a story about a well-meaning young lady that is always poking her nose into other people's business
 Scaredy Cat
 The 12½p Buytonic Boy

References

Comics magazines published in the United Kingdom
1976 comics debuts
Magazines established in 1976
Magazines disestablished in 1978
1978 comics endings
Fleetway and IPC Comics titles
Defunct British comics
British humour comics
Weekly magazines published in the United Kingdom